Aghcheh Kohal may refer to:
 Aghcheh Kohal-e Rajabanlu
 Aghcheh Kohal-e Zamani